Júlio César de Noronha (26 January 1845 – 11 September 1923) was Brazil's Minister of the Navy from 1902 to 1906. Under his direction, the country ordered a slate of warships from the United Kingdom that included three battleships, three armored cruisers, six destroyers, twelve torpedo boats, three submarines, a collier, and a training ship.  After his departure, the order was canceled by the subsequent Minister of the Navy  in favor of three dreadnoughts, three scout cruisers, and a plethora of smaller ships.

Earlier in Noronha's career, he commanded the corvette Vital de Oliveira. Under his command, the ship circumnavigated the world from 19 November 1879 to 21 January 1881. It was the first Brazilian ship to ever complete this feat.

See also 
South American dreadnought race
Isaías de Noronha

References

External links 
Santos, Julio Casar de Noronha

Brazilian admirals
1845 births
1923 deaths
Circumnavigators of the globe